KBOE-FM (104.9 FM) is a commercial radio station licensed to serve the community of Oskaloosa, Iowa.  The station primarily broadcasts a country music format.  KBOE-FM is owned by Jomast Corporation.

KBOE-FM provides live coverage of William Penn Statesmen & Oskaloosa Indian sports events as well as coverage of Iowa Hawkeye sports, NASCAR racing and area race tracks such as the Eddyville Raceway Park, Southern Iowa Speedway, Eldon Raceway, and Knoxville Raceway.

The transmitter and broadcast tower are located north of town at the intersection of Hwy 63 and 230th Street. The tower is also used as the antenna system for its sister station, KMZN (AM).

References

External links
KBOE-FM website

BOE